Hassan Jahangir (born 1 July 1962) is a Pakistani pop singer. He gained fame in the 1980s with hit singles such as "Hawa Hawa", "Hato Bacho", and "Shadi Na Karna Yaron". He released his first single "Imran Khan is a Superman" in 1982 and in June 1987 went on to release his one and only internationally famous album Hawa Hawa. It sold approximately 15 million copies in India. His music was acclaimed in South Asia, most notably Pakistan and India.

In 2011, with a fresh twist to a Bengali folk song Dol Dol Doloni, he came back into Pakistani music after absent of a long period. Bollywood Mubarakan released in 2017, is also a redecorated of the Pakistani song “Hawa Hawa” written by Rehan Azmi and sung by Hassan Jahangir in 1980s.

Discography
Hawa Hawa
Hato Bacho
Shadi Na Karna Yaron
Dil Hai Diwana
Dil Jo Tujh Pe Aaya Hai
Zindagi Hai Pyar
Maigha Jaise Roye
Le Bhi Le Dil Tu Mera
Shawa, Keh Nakhra
Na Jao Zara Mehandi Lagao
Aaya Hai Mausam Pyar Ka
Yeh Fashion Ke Naye Rang
Jee Jee O Parah Disco
Kis Naam Se Pukaron
Booba Booba Ba Ra Ra Ra
Aa Jaana Dil Hai Deewana
Dol Dol Doloni
Hawa Hawa Feat Gul Panra and Baloch Lewa, Coke Studio, Season 11

References

Living people
Pakistani pop singers
Pakistani composers
1962 births
Muhajir people
Singers from Karachi